Beech Creek may refer to:

Rivers
Beech Creek (Pennsylvania), a tributary of Bald Eagle Creek
Beech Creek (Texas)
Beech Creek (Logan County, West Virginia)

Communities
 Beech Creek, Kentucky, an unincorporated community in Muhlenberg County
 Beech Creek, Clay County, Kentucky, a creek and a wildlife area
 Beech Creek, Oregon, an unincorporated community in Grant County
 Beech Creek, Pennsylvania, a borough in Clinton County
 Beech Creek, Tennessee, an unincorporated community in Wayne County
 Beech Creek Township, Greene County, Indiana
 Beech Creek Township, Clinton County, Pennsylvania

Other
Beech Creek Railroad, a defunct railroad in Pennsylvania
Beech Creek National Scenic Area, near Big Cedar, Oklahoma

See also